Atta Boy is a 1926 American silent comedy film directed by Edward H. Griffith and starring Monty Banks, Virginia Bradford and Ernest Wood.

Cast
 Monty Banks as Monty Milde 
 Virginia Bradford as The Girl 
 Ernest Wood as Craven, Reporter 
 Fred Kelsey as Detective 
 Virginia Pearson as Madame Carlton 
 Henry A. Barrows as Mr. Harrie 
 Earl Metcalfe as Mr. Harrie's Brother 
 Mary Carr as Grandmother 
 Jimmy Phillips as Mr. Harrie's Kidnapped Son

References

Bibliography
 Munden, Kenneth White. The American Film Institute Catalog of Motion Pictures Produced in the United States, Part 1. University of California Press, 1997.

External links

1926 films
Silent American comedy films
Films directed by Edward H. Griffith
American silent feature films
1920s English-language films
Pathé Exchange films
1926 comedy films
1920s American films